Heart is a biweekly peer-reviewed medical journal covering all areas of cardiovascular medicine and surgery. It is the official journal of the British Cardiovascular Society. It was established in 1939 as the British Heart Journal and is published by the BMJ Group. The name was changed from British Heart Journal to Heart in 1996 with the start of volume 75. The editor-in-chief is Catherine Otto (University of Washington).

A sister journal, Open Heart, was established in 2010 with the aim of covering cardiovascular research with less emphasis on novelty or priority.

History
In 2010, Heart established a sister journal, Heart Asia.  It was the official journal of the Asia Pacific Heart Association and aimed to focus on cardiovascular research in the Asia Pacific region. In 2019, the journal ceased publication.

Abstracting and indexing
The journal is abstracted and indexed by Index Medicus, Science Citation Index Expanded, EMBASE, and Scopus. According to the Journal Citation Reports, its 2020 impact factor is 5.994, ranking it 31st out of 142 journals in the category "Cardiac and Cardiovascular Systems".

Editors-in-chief
The following persons have been editor-in-chief of the journal:
Davis Evan Bedford, John Maurice Hardman Campbell 1939-?
K. Shirley Smith ?-1972
Walter Somerville 1973-?
Roger Hall ?-2006
Adam Timmis 2007-2013
Catherine Otto 2014–present

Most cited articles 
According to Scopus, the following three articles from Heart have been cited most often (>700 times):

References

External links

Biweekly journals
Publications established in 1939
English-language journals
Cardiology journals
BMJ Group academic journals
Academic journals associated with learned and professional societies